Haywood is an unincorporated community  in Pittsburg County, Oklahoma, United States. A post office was established at Haywood, Indian Territory on September 20, 1904. The community, located in a coal mining region, was named for William D. "Big Bill" Haywood, a prominent socialist and labor leader of the era. At the time of its founding, Haywood was located in Tobucksy County, Choctaw Nation.

The north entrance to the McAlester Army Ammunition Plant is located in Haywood.

Demographics

References

Unincorporated communities in Pittsburg County, Oklahoma
Unincorporated communities in Oklahoma